Mimudea fracidalis is a moth in the family Crambidae. It was described by George Hampson in 1913. It is found in Indonesia, where it has been recorded from Sumatra.

References

Moths described in 1913
Spilomelinae